Pyranine is a hydrophilic, pH-sensitive fluorescent dye from the group of chemicals known as arylsulfonates. Pyranine is soluble in water and has applications as a coloring agent, biological stain, optical detecting reagent, and a pH indicator. One example would be the measurement of intracellular pH. Pyranine is also found in yellow highlighters, giving them their characteristic fluorescence and bright yellow-green colour. It is also found in some types of soap.

Synthesis 
It is synthesized from pyrenetetrasulfonic acid and a solution of sodium hydroxide in water under reflux. The trisodium salt crystallizes as yellow needles when adding an aqueous solution of sodium chloride.

See also 

 Fluorescein
 Fluorescence

References

External links 
 CTD's Pyranine page from the Comparative Toxicogenomics Database

Staining dyes
Fluorescent dyes
Sulfonates
Pyrenes
Phenols
Organic sodium salts